The Queens Royals women's basketball team represents the Queens University of Charlotte in Charlotte, North Carolina, United States.  The Royals joined the NCAA Division I ASUN Conference on July 1, 2022 after 9 seasons in the Division II South Atlantic Conference. Due to the NCAA's policy on reclassifying programs, the Royals will not be eligible to compete in the NCAA tournament or the WNIT until the 2026–27 season.

The team is currently led by third year head coach Jen Brown and play their home games at Curry Arena.

History
Queens fielded its first women's basketball team in the 1989-90 season; Cheryl Fielitz was the team's first head coach.

Postseason results

NCAA Division II Tournament results
Queens never appeared in the NCAA Division II Tournament during their tenure in Division II.

See also
Queens Royals men's basketball

References

External links
Website